Jermaine Brown (born 22 March 1985) is a Caymanian footballer who plays as a goalkeeper. He represented the Cayman Islands including in a World Cup qualifying match in 2011 and twice at the 2010 Caribbean Championship.

References

Association football goalkeepers
Living people
1985 births
Caymanian footballers
Cayman Islands international footballers
Scholars International players